Flavors is a 2003 romantic comedy film written and directed by Raj Nidimoru and Krishna D.K., concerning Indian immigrants in America.

Plot
Flavors tells the stories of 13 different main characters in five parallel story lines. The marriage of NRI Rad (Anupam Mittal) to his American fiancée (Jicky Schnee) brings his family to the US where they quickly adapt to American ways. Meanwhile, Kartik (Reef Karim), tries to maintain a long-distance relationship with his friend Rachna (Pooja Kumar) and bored housewife Sangita (Sireesha Katragadda) is neglected by her workaholic husband (Gaurang Vyas).

Cast
 Anupam Mittal as Rad
 Jicky Schnee as Jenni
 Reef Karim as Kartik
 Pooja Kumar as Rachana
 Sireesha Katragadd as Sangita
 Gaurang Vyas as Sangita's husband
 Anjan Srivastav
 Bharati Achrekar
 Rishma Malik

Release
Flavors was an official selection at the Cairo International Film Festival, the Hamptons International Film Festival, the Milan Film Festival, the Hawaii International Film Festival, the Bangkok International Film Festival, the San Francisco International Film Festival, the Asian American International Film Festival and the Mumbai Film Festival.

Reception

Critical reception
Flavors received mostly positive reviews form critics. Vivek Kumar of Rediff said that "Filmmaking is all about captivating your audience; it is the business of filmmaking and Flavors succeeds in this business venture." Screen called it "innovative" and "entertaining" while Dave Kehr of The New York Times termed it "bright, good-spirited and blissfully short".

Box office
In the US, the film grossed around $150,000 on 14 screens.

Awards
For their work on Flavors, Nidimoru and Krishna DK received a nomination for Best Emerging Directors at the Asian American International Film Festival in New York. The film also won the President Award at the 2003 Fort Lauderdale International Film Festival. Pooja Kumar received the Screen Actors Guild Emerging Actor Award for her performance.

References

External links

Review by Chitra Mahesh of the Hindu

2003 films
2003 romantic comedy films
Films about Indian Americans
American romantic comedy films
Films directed by Raj Nidimoru and Krishna D.K.
2000s English-language films
2000s American films